Nosheen Saeed (born 6 July 1958) is a Pakistani politician who served as member of the National Assembly of Pakistan.

Early life
Saeed was born on 6 July 1958.

Political career
She was elected to the National Assembly of Pakistan as a candidate of Pakistan Muslim League (Q) on a seat reserved for women from Punjab in the 2008 Pakistani general election.

References

1958 births
Living people
Pakistani MNAs 2008–2013